Turnstones are two bird species that comprise the genus Arenaria in the family Scolopacidae. They are closely related to calidrid sandpipers  and might be considered members of the tribe Calidriini.

The genus Arenaria was introduced by the French zoologist Mathurin Jacques Brisson in 1760 with the ruddy turnstone (Arenaria interpres) as the type species.  The genus name arenaria is from Latin arenarius, "inhabiting sand", from arena, "sand".

The genus contains two species: the ruddy turnstone (Arenaria interpres) and the black turnstone (Arenaria melanocephala). Both birds are waders. Their length is typically between 20 and 25 cm, with a wingspan between 50 and 60 cm and a body mass between 110 and 130g. For waders their build is stocky, with short, slightly upturned, wedge shaped bills. They have white patches on the back, wings and tail. They are high Arctic breeders, and are migratory. Their strong necks and powerful, slightly upturned bills are adapted to their feeding technique. As the name implies, these species overturn stones, seaweed, and similar items in search of invertebrate prey. They are strictly coastal, prefer stony beaches to sand, and often share beach space with other species of waders such as purple sandpipers.

Species

Ruddy turnstone
The ruddy turnstone (or just turnstone in Europe), Arenaria interpres, has a circumpolar distribution, and is a very long distance migrant, wintering on coasts as far south as South Africa and Australia. It is thus a common sight on coasts almost everywhere in the world. It is one of the species to which the Agreement on the Conservation of African-Eurasian Migratory Waterbirds (AEWA) applies.

In breeding plumage, this is a showy bird, with a black-and-white head, chestnut back, white underparts and red legs. The drabber winter plumage is basically brown above and white below. This is a generally tame bird and is an opportunist feeder. Unlike most waders, it will scavenge, and has a phenomenal list of recorded food items, including human corpses and coconut. The call is a staccato tuck- tuck- tuck.

Black turnstone

The black turnstone (Arenaria melanocephala) has a similar structure to its widespread relative, but has black upperparts and chest, and white below. It has a much more restricted range than the ruddy turnstone, breeding in western Alaska, and wintering mainly on the Pacific coast of the United States.

There exists a fossil bone, a distal piece of tarsometatarsus found in the Edson Beds of Sherman County, Kansas. Dating from the mid-Blancan some 4-3 million years ago, it appears to be from a calidriid somewhat similar to a pectoral sandpiper, but has some traits reminiscent of turnstones. Depending on which traits are apomorphic and plesiomorphic, it may be an ancestral representative of either lineage.

References

External links

 Ruddy turnstone – Cornell Lab of Ornithology
 Ruddy turnstone Arenaria interpres – USGS Patuxent Bird Identification InfoCenter
 Turnstones feeding and bathing

Sandpipers
 
 
Taxa named by Mathurin Jacques Brisson